Cerberiopsis neriifolia is a species of plant in the family Apocynaceae. It is endemic to New Caledonia.

References

Endemic flora of New Caledonia
neriifolia
Endangered plants
Taxonomy articles created by Polbot